Lynne Sue Moon (born 1949) is a British former child actress of the 1960s, best known for her appearance in the historical drama 55 Days at Peking.

Biography
Moon was born in Islington, London, the daughter of a Cantonese father and a British mother. She studied ballet for two years at London's Arts Educational School. According to Welsh artist Clive Hicks-Jenkins, she and he attended the Italia Conti Academy of Theatre Arts in London at the same time.

She made her film debut in 55 Days at Peking (1963), in which she played a girl orphaned during the Boxer Rebellion whom Charlton Heston takes under his wing. She followed this with a role as a Chinese diplomat's niece in William Castle's juvenile espionage film, 13 Frightened Girls (1963). She portrayed a Yuan dynasty princess in the 1965 historical film Marco the Magnificent. Her final known credited acting role was as a student of Sidney Poitier in To Sir With Love (1967), after which she retired from acting.

Filmography
55 Days at Peking (1963) as Teresa
13 Frightened Girls (1963) as Mai-Ling
Marco the Magnificent (1965) as Princess Gogatine (billed as Lee Sue Moon)
To Sir With Love (1967) as Miss Wong (billed as Lynn Sue Moon)
The File of the Golden Goose (1969) Girl dancing (uncredited)

References

External links 

People from the London Borough of Islington
British actresses of Chinese descent
1949 births
Living people
Actresses from London
20th-century British actresses
British film actresses
English child actresses
20th-century English women
20th-century English people